Barzok District is a district (bakhsh) in Kashan County, Isfahan Province, Iran. At the 2006 census, its population was 10,267, in 3,065 families.  The District has one city: Barzok. The District has two rural districts (dehestan): Babaafzal Rural District and Golab Rural District.

References 

Kashan County
Districts of Isfahan Province